Gmina Maszewo may refer to either of the following administrative districts in Poland:
Gmina Maszewo, West Pomeranian Voivodeship
Gmina Maszewo, Lubusz Voivodeship